Events in the year 1932 in Germany.

Incumbents

National level
President
 Paul von Hindenburg (Non-partisan)

Chancellor
 Heinrich Brüning (Centre) to 30 May, then from 1 June Franz von Papen (Centre to 3 June, then Non-partisan) then 17 November, then from 3 December Kurt von Schleicher (Non-partisan)

Events
 25 February – Adolf Hitler obtains German citizenship by naturalization, opening the opportunity for him to run in the 1932 election for Reichspräsident.
 10 April – Paul von Hindenburg is elected president of Germany.
 30 May – Chancellor Heinrich Brüning resigns. President Hindenburg asks Franz von Papen to form a new government.
 16 June – Bans against the SS and SA are overturned. 
 17 July – Altona Bloody Sunday: In Altona, armed communists attack a National Socialist demonstration; 18 are killed. Many other political street fights follow.
 31 July – Federal election: The Nazi Party gains a plurality and the Communists also gain seats.  This creates a "negative majority" that prevents any majority coalition that does not include one of the two parties.
 30 August – Hermann Göring becomes the head of the German Parliament
 6 November – Federal election: The Nazis lose many seats, but retain the plurality as the Communists continue to gain. (This is the last free and fair election held throughout East-Germany until 1990.)
 21 November – President Hindenburg begins negotiations with Adolf Hitler about the formation of a new government.
 3 December – President Hindenburg names Kurt von Schleicher as German chancellor.
 25 December – A patent is filed for Prontosil, an antibacterial drug discovered in Wuppertal.

Births
 6 January - Max Streibl, German politician (died 1998)
 7 January - Wolfgang Reichmann, German actor (died 1991)
 31 January - Michael Degen, German actor
 7 February - Anton Schlembach, German bishop of Roman Catholic Church (died 2020)
 9 February - Gerhard Richter, German visual artist
 14 February - Alexander Kluge, German film director
 18 February - Andreas Meyer-Hanno, German theater and opera director (died 2006)
 25 February - Hans Apel, German politician (died 2011)
 25 March - Wolfgang Helfrich, German physicist and inventor
 2 April - Siegfried Rauch, German actor (died 2018)
 16 April - Eberhard Panitz, German writer and screenwriter (died 2021)
 8 May - Arnulf Baring, German author, historian, political scientist and journalist (died 2019)
 21 May - Gabriele Wohmann, German novelist (died 2015)
 26 May - Frank Beyer, German film director (died 2006)
 2 June - Bruno Schleinstein, German actor (died 2010)
 10 June - Philipp Jenninger, German politician (died 2018)
 21 June - Friedrich Ostermann, German Roman Catholic auxiliary bishop from Münster (died 2018)
 25 June - Clark M. Blatteis, German-born American physiologist (died 2021)
 3 July - Alexander Schalck-Golodkowski, German politician (died 2015)
 4 July - Marlene Lenz, German politician (CDU) and translator
 10 July - Jürgen Becker, German poet
 14 July - Princess Margarita of Baden, German noblewoman (died 2013)
 30 July - Michael Bruno, German-born former governor of Israel's central bank and a Chief Economist of the World Bank (died 1996)
 19 September - Stefanie Zweig, German writer (died 2014)
 24 September - Walter Wallmann, German politician (died 2013)
 16 October - Detlev Karsten Rohwedder, German politician (died 1991)
 28 October - Gerhart Baum, German politician
 29 October - Charlotte Knobloch,  President of Central Council of Jews in Germany
 1 November - Edgar Reitz, German film director
 14 November - Gunter Sachs, German-Swiss photographer and art collector  (died 2011)
 21 November - Heinrich Lummer, German politician (CDU) (died 2019)
 22 November - Günter Sawitzki, German international goalkeeper (died 2020)
 25 November – Franz Grave, German Roman Catholic prelate (died 2022)
 28 November – Kurt Horres, German stage director (died 2023)
 19 December – Bernhard Vogel, German politician
 31 December – Felix Rexhausen, German journalist (died 1992)

Deaths 
 13 January – Sophia of Prussia, Prussian princess (born 1870)
 24 January – Eugen Boermel, German sculptor, writer and inventor (born 1858)
 25 January – Ernst Friedberger, German immunologist and hygienist (born 1875)
 6 February – Hermann Ottomar Herzog, German American landscape painter (born 1831)
 18 February – Frederick Augustus III of Saxony, Germane last King of Saxony (1904–1918) and a member of the House of Wettin (born 1865)
 15 March – Friedrich Radszuweit, German publisher and author (born 1876)
 2 April – Hugo von Kathen, German general (born 1855)
 4 April – Wilhelm Ostwald, German chemist (born 1853)
 6 April – Max Lenz, German historian (born 1850)
 26 June – Ernst Scholz, German lawyer and politician (born 1874)
 2 September – Christian Wilhelm Karl Ewald (born 1852)
 20 September – Max Slevogt, German painter (born 1868)
 3 October – Max Wolf, German astronomer (born 1863)
 23 October – Arthur von Posadowsky-Wehner, German politician (born 1845)
 11 November – Ludwig Hoffmann, German architect (born 1852)
 10 December – Eugen Bamberger, German chemist (born 1857)
 18 December – Eduard Bernstein, German politician (born 1851)

References

 
Years of the 20th century in Germany
Germany
Germany